Chief Scientist is the most senior science position at the National Aeronautics and Space Administration (NASA). The chief scientist serves as the principal advisor to the NASA Administrator in science issues and as interface to the national and international science community, ensuring that NASA research programs are scientifically and technologically well founded and are appropriate for their intended applications.

History
The Chief Scientist position was created to advise the NASA Administrator on budget, strategic objectives, and current content of NASA's science programs. The Chief Scientist works closely with appropriate representatives of the NASA Strategic Enterprises and the Field Centers, as well as advisory committees and the external community. The Chief Scientist represents the agency's scientific objectives and accomplishments to other federal agencies, industry, academia, other government organizations, the international community, and the general public.

The chief scientist chairs the NASA Science Council, a forum for discussion of the agency policies, practices, and issues from the viewpoint of the science disciplines.

The NASA chief scientist position was discontinued in September 2005 and many of the functions moved to be within the Science Mission Directorate (SMD).

The position was restored in 2011.

List of chief scientists
 Dr. Frank B. McDonald, 1982 to 1987
 Dr. Noel Hinners, 1987 to 1989
 Dr. France A. Córdova, 1993 to 1996 
 Dr. Kathie L. Olsen, May 24, 1999, to 2002  
 Dr. Shannon Lucid, 2002 to September 2003
 Dr. John M. Grunsfeld, September 2003 to 2004 
 Dr. James B. Garvin, October 2004 to September 2005 
 Dr. Waleed Abdalati, January 2011 to December 2012 
 Dr. Ellen Stofan, August 25, 2013, to December 2016
 Dr. Jim Green, May 1, 2018 to December, 2021
 Dr. Katherine Calvin, January 10, 2022 to present

References